The Book of Games Volume 1 is a game compendium by gameXplore, examining 150 video games from 2005 through 2006 covering most of the current game platforms. It covers topics such as the future of games, game heroes, from games to movies, and research on games.

See also
List of books on computer and video games
The Book of Games Volume 2

External links
Book series website
Google Books electronic preview of the Book

2006 non-fiction books
Books about video games